Omar Méndez (born 6 February 1961) is a Nicaraguan boxer. He competed in the men's lightweight event at the 1984 Summer Olympics. Méndez also represented Nicaragua at the 1983 Pan American Games.

References

1961 births
Living people
Nicaraguan male boxers
Olympic boxers of Nicaragua
Boxers at the 1984 Summer Olympics
Pan American Games competitors for Nicaragua
Boxers at the 1983 Pan American Games
Place of birth missing (living people)
Lightweight boxers